Pixter was among the first portable handheld touch screen drawing toys for children invented by Rehco, LLC and marketed by Fisher Price from 2000 through 2007. 
Pixter was pre-programmed with fun content and repeatable play. Pixter also could accept cartridge-based games and other activities. Pixter was originally marketed successfully with a black-and-white display but later was upgraded to a color display.

The Pixter line has become something of an obscurity, with little information left on the internet about the history of it, sales records, original pricing, release dates, etc.

The Pixter remains, as of 2017, the second to last console Mattel has ever released, after the HyperScan. However, Pixter is Fisher Price's first and only handheld game system.

Gameplay
The original Pixter had a black and white LCD display. Its touch-sensitive LCD screen was activated by a drawing stylus. It used 4 AA batteries.

Models

Pixter
(2000-2002)
The original Pixter came in several colors. Otherwise, they are the same unit.
 Purple
 Green
 Blue

Pixter Plus
(2002)
Similar to the original Pixter, except with a "Plus" subcategory of 10 additional activities in the Pixter's main menu and 20 times more storage space than the original Pixter unit. It also has a flexible screen light.

Pixter 2.0
(2003)
Played the same cartridges as the original, but included digital drawing and quick-paint tools, as well as a wireless link. The wireless link could be used to send messages and pictures between other Pixter 2.0's. It used 4 AA batteries.

Pixter Color
(2003-2005)
Pixter Color is extremely similar to the original Pixter, but now with 128 colors and double the screen resolution. It used newer cartridges that could not be used with the original Pixter. With the use of an adapter, Pixter Color could play original Pixter titles. It used 4 AA batteries.

Pocket Pixter
(2004-2006)
The Pocket Pixters were key-chain sized dedicated consoles that included a drawing program centered around a theme and a built-in game. They used three Button Cell (LR44) batteries.

editions
Pets
Fashion
Sports
Dino
Hearts

Pixter Multi-media system
(2005) The Pixter Multi-Media System reportedly had 100 creative tools, games, & activities-built in, including a touch screen with stylus and had streaming video capabilities. There were also exclusive cartridges available for the system. It used 4 AA batteries.

Games/Media released

Pixter, 2.0, Plus

 Action Art
 Arcade
 Art Safari
 Art Safari 2
 Barbie: Fashion Show
 Cool Wheels
 Crazy Word Factory
 Dino Draw
 Dinosaurs Adventure
 Disney Fun
 Disney's Doug
 Enchanted Princess
 Learning Fun
 Monster Shop
 Music Studio
 Music Video
 On the Go Games
 PB&J Otter
 Rescue Heroes: Mission Masters
 Rocket Power
 SpongeBob SquarePants 
 Sports
 Story Composer
 Toy Designer

Color

 Alphabet Forest
 Arcade
 Arthur's Birthday
 Barbie Fashion Show
 Barbie Writing
 Cars
 Clifford the Big Red Dog
 Color Pixter Digital Camera
 Creative Genius
 Cyberchase
 Dino Draw
 Disney's Doug
 Dora the Explorer
 Global Passport
 Hot Wheels
 Just Grandma and Me
 Math Mansion
 PB&J Otter
 Pet Shop
 Puzzles and Games
 Rescue Heroes
 Scooby-Doo!
 SpongeBob
 Starter Learner Game
 Symphony Painter
 Teen Titans
 The Adventures of Jimmy Neutron: Boy Genius
 The Angry Beavers
 The Fairly OddParents
 Word Island
 ¡Mucha Lucha!

Multimedia system

References

External links
 Pixter Homepage
 Fisher-Price Homepage

Fisher-Price
Handheld game consoles
Mattel consoles
Sixth-generation video game consoles